4.5: The Best of the Indigo Girls is a 1995 greatest hits compilation from Epic Records for American folk rock duo Indigo Girls.

Reception
The editorial staff of AllMusic Guide gave this compilation three out of five stars, with reviewer Chris Woodstra noting that the compilation "does the job of introducing the band to the foreign market, its lack of rarities and prohibitive import price make it unnecessary for the U.S."

Track listing
"Joking" (Amy Ray, from Rites of Passage, 1992) – 3:34
"Hammer and a Nail" (Emily Saliers, from Nomads Indians Saints, 1990) – 3:51
"Kid Fears" (Ray, from Indigo Girls, 1989) – 4:35
"Galileo" (Saliers, from Rites of Passage, 1992) – 4:13
"Tried to Be True" (Ray, from Indigo Girls, 1989) – 3:00
"Power of Two" (Saliers, from Swamp Ophelia, 1994) – 5:23
"Pushing the Needle Too Far" (Ray, from Nomads Indians Saints, 1990) – 4:13
"Reunion" (Ray, from Swamp Ophelia, 1994) – 3:28
"Closer to Fine" (Saliers, from Indigo Girls, 1989) – 4:02
"Three Hits" (Ray, from Rites of Passage, 1992)3:11
"Least Complicated" (Saliers, from Swamp Ophelia, 1994) – 4:12
"Touch Me Fall" (Ray, from Swamp Ophelia, 1994) – 6:13
"Love's Recovery" (Saliers, from Indigo Girls, 1989) – 4:24
"Land of Canaan" (Ray, from Strange Fire, 1987) – 3:57
"Ghost" (Saliers, from Indigo Girls, 1989) – 5:14

Personnel

"Joking"
Amy Ray – acoustic guitar, hand claps, vocals
Emily Saliers – acoustic guitar, hand claps, vocals
Kenny Aronoff – drums, percussion
Sara Lee – bass guitar
David Leonard – mixing at Scream Studios in Studio City, Los Angeles, California, United States
Scott Litt – engineering, production
Pat McCarthy – recording at Bearsville Studios in Bearsville, New York, United States
Benmont Tench – organ
"Hammer and Nail"
Amy Ray – acoustic guitar, vocals
Emily Saliers – acoustic guitar, vocals
Mary Chapin Carpenter – vocals
Paulinho da Costa – percussion
Kenny Aronoff – drums, percussion
Peter Holsapple – accordion
Sara Lee – bass guitar
Scott Litt – engineering, production
Benmont Tench – accordion
"Kid Fears"
Amy Ray – guitar, vocals
Emily Saliers – guitar, vocals
John Keane – 12-string guitar
Scott Litt – engineering, production
Michael Stipe – vocals
Dede Vogt – bass guitar
"Galileo"
Amy Ray – acoustic guitar, vocals
Emily Saliers – acoustic and electric guitars, vocals
Jackson Browne – backing vocals
David Crosby – backing vocals
Lisa Germano – fiddle
Scott Litt – engineering, production
Sara Lee – bass guitar
David Leonard – mixing at Scream Studios in Studio City, Los Angeles, California, United States
Jerry Marotta – drums, percussion, piano
Pat McCarthy – recording at Bearsville Studios in Bearsville, New York, United States
Martin McCarrick – accordion, cello
Talvin Singh – percussion
"Tried to Be True"
Amy Ray – guitar, vocals
Emily Saliers – electric guitar, vocals
Bill Berry – drums
Peter Buck – electric guitar
John Keane – shakers
Scott Litt – engineering, production
Mike Mills – bass
"Power of Two"
Amy Ray – acoustic guitar, vocals
Emily Saliers – acoustic guitar, vocals
Samantha Anderson – backing vocals
Peter Collins – production
Marc Frigo – engineering assistance
Lisa Germano – mandolin
Chuck Leavell – piano
Sara Lee – bass guitar
David Leonard – engineering, mixing at Woodland Studios in Nashville, Tennessee, United States
Jerry Marotta – drums, percussion
Bill Newton – chromatic harmonica
John Mark Painter – flugelhorn
Danny Thompson – double bass
"Pushing the Needle Too Far"
Amy Ray – acoustic guitar, vocals
Emily Saliers – acoustic guitar, vocals
Peter Holsapple – accordion
Sara Lee – bass guitar
Scott Litt – engineering, production
Michael Lorrant – drums
"Reunion"
Amy Ray – acoustic guitar, vocals
Emily Saliers – acoustic guitar, bouzouki, vocals
Peter Collins – production
Lisa Germano – mandolin, violin
Sara Lee – bass guitar
David Leonard – engineering, mixing
Michael Lorant and The Roches – backing vocals
Jerry Marotta – drums
Danny Thompson – double bass
"Closer to Fine"
Amy Ray – guitar, vocals
Emily Saliers – guitar, vocals
Luka Bloom – backing vocals
Paulinho da Costa – percussion
Scott Litt – engineering, production
Fiachna Ó Braonáin – tin whistle, backing vocals
Liam Ó Maonlaí – bodhrán, backing vocals
Peter O’Toole – mandolin, backing vocals
"Three Hits"
Amy Ray – acoustic and electric guitars, vocals
Emily Saliers – acoustic guitar, vocals
Ronan Browne – uilleann pipes
Budgie – drums, percussion
Peter Collins – production
Lisa Germano – fiddle
Sara Lee – bass guitar
David Leonard – mixing at Scream Studios in Studio City, Los Angeles, California, United States
Dónal Lunny – bodhrán, bouzouki
Pat McCarthy – engineering at Bearsville Studios in Bearsville, New York, United States
"Least Complicated"
Amy Ray – acoustic guitar, vocals
Emily Saliers – acoustic guitar, vocals
David Leonard – engineering, mixing
Peter Collins – production
John Mark Painter – accordion
Jo-El Sonnier – accordion
Sara Lee – bass guitar
Jerry Marotta – drums, percussion, bongos
Lisa Germano – mandolin, tin whistle
Michael Lorant – backing vocals
"Touch Me Fall"
Amy Ray – electric gui:tar, vocals
Emily Saliers – electric guitar, vocals
David Leonard – engineering and mixing at Woodland Studios in Nashville, Tennessee, United States
Peter Collins – production
Jan Dykes – bass guitar
James Hall – trumpet
Sara Lee – bass guitar
The Love Sponge Quartet – strings
David Davidson – violin
Anthony LaMarchina – cello
Christian Teal – violin
Kristin Wilkinson – viola
Jerry Marotta – drums
John Mark Painter – flugelhorn, string arrangement
"Love's Recovery"
Amy Ray – guitar, vocals
Emily Saliers – guitar, vocals
Scott Litt – engineering, production
Dede Vogt – bass guitar
Jai Winding – piano
"Land of Canaan:
Amy Ray – guitar, vocals
Emily Saliers – guitar, vocals
Paulinho da Costa – percussion
Jay Dee Daugherty – drums
John Keane – slide guitar
Scott Litt – engineering, production
Kasim Sulton – bass guitar
"Ghost"
Amy Ray – acoustic guitar, vocals
Emily Saliers – acoustic guitar, vocals
Pat McCarthy – engineering at Bearsville Studios in Bearsville, New York, United States
Peter Collins – production
John Jennings – electric guitar
Michael Kamen – conducting, string arrangement
Sara Lee – bass guitar
David Leonard – mixing at Scream Studios in Studio City, Los Angeles, California, United States
Jerry Marotta – drums, percussion
Simone Simonton – cymbals
Jai Winding – piano

See also
List of 1995 albums

References

External links

1995 greatest hits albums
Indigo Girls compilation albums
Epic Records compilation albums
Albums produced by Scott Litt
Albums produced by Peter Collins (record producer)